Pavlo Rybkovskyi (born 12 July 1989 in the Ukrainian SSR of the Soviet Union) is a Ukrainian football defender who plays for FC Sumy in the Ukrainian First League.

Rybkovskyi began his playing career with FC Volyn Lutsk's youth team. Than he spent some years in other teams, but played only in the Ukrainian First League.

International career 
He played some matches for Ukraine national youth football teams of different ages.

References

External links 
Profile at Official Site FFU (Ukr)

Ukrainian footballers
FC Volyn Lutsk players
FC Hoverla Uzhhorod players
FC Arsenal-Kyivshchyna Bila Tserkva players
PFC Sumy players
FC Bukovyna Chernivtsi players
1989 births
Living people
Association football defenders
Footballers from Lutsk